"Teacher's Aide" is the first segment of the seventh episode from the first season (1985–86) of the television series The Twilight Zone. In this segment, a high school teacher begins picking fights with disruptive students after she is exposed to a mystic gargoyle.

Plot
Miss Peters is an English teacher at a gang-infested high school where fights between different gangs are the norm. Trying to stop one of these clashes, she sees a gargoyle on the rooftop of the school's main entrance which appears to be watching over her. After this incident, Miss Peters begins to exhibit aggressive behavior, starting physical confrontations with students who misbehave. At home, her dog barks at her for no apparent reason, and she wakes up one morning to find shred marks in her mattress. She suspects there is something wrong with her, but decides against looking into it.

Miss Peters's aggression draws the ire of the gang members. After she crushes the boom box of a gang member nicknamed Wizard with her bare hands, he plans to beat her to death with a baseball bat when the school building is empty. He follows her into a storage room. Miss Peters emerges resembling a gargoyle and throws Wizard to the floor. As she is getting ready to kill him, she sees herself in a mirror and recoils. Lightning repeatedly strikes the gargoyle on the rooftop, destroying it, as Miss Peters backs into a power box, knocking her out cold. Wizard thanks Miss Peters, now returned to her normal self, for sparing his life. The two leave the storeroom.

External links
 

1985 American television episodes
The Twilight Zone (1985 TV series season 1) episodes

fr:Lieu maudit